The Toronto Bicycling Network (TBN) is Toronto's largest recreational cycling organization. It was formed in 1983 by cycling enthusiasts Richard Aaron and Norm Myshok. By 2008, the TBN had grown to over 900 members.

See also
 Cycling in Toronto
 Toronto Donut Ride

References

External links 
 Toronto Bicycling Network website

Cycling organizations in Canada
T